Muhabbetina is a genus of moths of the family Tortricidae.

Species
Muhabbetina chromataspis (Meyrick, 1913)
Muhabbetina pectinata (Diakonoff, 1988)
Muhabbetina psimythistes (Diakonoff, 1988)

See also
List of Tortricidae genera

References

External links
tortricidae.com

Tortricidae genera
Olethreutinae